Eten (Iten) is a Plateau language of Nigeria. The people who speak this language, the Niten are found in the town of Ganawuri in Plateau State.

References

External links
Roger Blench: Iten (Ganawuri) page

Beromic languages
Languages of Nigeria